Karin Argoud (born November 8, 1960) is an American actress. She is best known for her role as Sonja Harper in the American sitcom Mama's Family for its first two seasons.

Argoud made her first Hollywood acting appearance in the ABC Afterschool Special program Tough Girl (1981). She appeared on Mama's Family when it first ran, on NBC in 1983–1984, but her character was written out of the series when was revived for first-run syndication in 1986.

In 2000, Argoud appeared in the film The Stonecutter.

References

External links

1960 births
Living people
American television actresses
Actresses from California
People from Davis, California
21st-century American women